The Tweeddale Press Group is a newspaper and magazine publisher in the Scottish Borders, which has been a subsidiary of the Johnston Press since 2000.

History
The Berwickshire Advertiser was established in 1808 and moved into premises at 90 Marygate, Berwick-upon-Tweed in 1900. Tweeddale Press Group was formed in 1950 when Berwick Advertiser owner Major J.I.M. Smail bought the Southern Reporter. The group took over the Berwickshire News in 1957. In 2000, the Smail family sold the Tweeddale Press Group to Johnston Press.

Current titles
The group currently publishes the following titles:
 Berwick Advertiser
 Berwickshire News
 Carrick Gazette
 East Lothian News
 Galloway Gazette
 Hawick News
 Lothian Times
 Midlothian Advertiser
 Musselburgh News
 Selkirk Weekend Advertiser
 Southern Reporter
 Peebles Times

Previous titles
Tweeddale Press Group previously owned and published other titles:
 Morpeth Herald was acquired by the group in 1983, then sold to Northeast Press in 1992.
 Ponteland Observer was bought by the group in 1984, with the last edition being published in January 1986 then merged with the Morpeth Herald.
 Alnwick Advertiser, founded by the group in 1979, was sold to Northeast Press in 1992 and immediately merged with their Northumberland Gazette.
 Kelso Chronicle and Jedburgh Gazette, an amalgamation of several previous titles, itself merged with the Southern Reporter in 1983.

References

Newspaper companies of Scotland
 
Publishing companies established in 1950